Jonathan Chiedozie Obika (born 12 September 1990) is an English professional footballer who plays as a striker for Scottish Premiership club Motherwell, on loan from League One club Morecambe.

Club career

Tottenham
Obika is a product of the Tottenham Hotspur youth system and was the top scorer for the academy side in the 2007–08 season. He made his first team debut in the UEFA Cup on 27 November 2008 against NEC Nijmegen. He also played against Ukrainian side FC Shakhtar Donetsk in the same competition. He signed a more secure contract with the club in January 2009.

On 19 March 2009 he signed with League One team Yeovil Town on a month's loan. His loan was extended until the end of the 2008–09 season in April. In his two-month loan spell he played 10 games scoring four goals.

Obika returned to Yeovil on a three-month loan on 11 August 2009. He scored in his third game of the 2009–10 season against Leyton Orient. He scored again on 1 September against Bournemouth in the Football League Trophy, coming on as a substitute at half time. Along with fellow Tottenham loanees Steven Caulker and Ryan Mason, his loan was extended until the end of the season on 5 November.

On 11 February, Obika was sent back to Spurs due to the return to Yeovil of Arron Davies and was then immediately sent on loan to fellow League One side Millwall. On 13 April, Obika scored an injury time equaliser for Millwall against Yeovil and despite what it meant to Millwall's promotion push, he didn't celebrate as a mark of respect for his old club.

On 20 August, Obika returned to south London to join Crystal Palace on a season-long loan deal. However this was cut short in early January after a series of disappointing performances, and he went on loan to Peterborough United instead.
He then joined Swindon Town a few weeks later until the end of the season but was recalled after lack of opportunities at Swindon. Obika then subsequently rejoined Yeovil until the end of the season, his third club of the 2010–11 season, and made 11 appearances scoring 3 goals.

Obika then rejoined Yeovil on loan at the start of the 2011–12 season until January 2012, this deal was later extended until the end of the season. On 26 December 2011, Obika scored the first goal of his new loan deal against Charlton Athletic with an overhead kick, and he then went on to score against Carlisle, Sheffield Wednesday and Leyton Orient.

In February 2013, Obika signed on loan with Championship side Charlton Athletic for the remainder of the 2012–13 season and also signed a one-year contract extension with Spurs until 2014. Obika scored his first goal for Charlton against Leeds United, a stoppage time header to win the match 2–1. Obika followed this up with a 90th-minute winner against Wolves.

On 8 January 2014, Obika joined Championship club Brighton & Hove Albion on an initial three-month loan deal.
He scored his first goal for Brighton in the FA Cup 4th round tie against Port Vale in the 78th minute, Brighton won 3–1. Rohan Ince & Solomon March scored the other two goals for the Albion. After his deal with Brighton expired, Obika rejoined Charlton Athletic on loan, for the remainder of the season.

Swindon Town
Obika left Tottenham and joined League One club Swindon Town on 1 September 2014 for an undisclosed fee. He signed a deal to keep him at The County Ground for two years. On 15 June 2017, Obika confirmed that he would be leaving Swindon upon the expiry of his current deal after a three-year spell at the County Ground.

Oxford United
Obika became new manager Pep Clotet's first signing at Swindon's rivals Oxford United when his two-year deal was announced on 5 July 2017. He made his debut as a substitute against Oldham Athletic in the opening match of the 2017–18 season, which ended in a 2–0 away victory for Oxford, and made his home debut and first starting appearance, and scored his first goal, in the following game, a 4–3 defeat to Cheltenham Town in the first round of the EFL Cup. He was released after his contract expired after the 2018–19 season.

St Mirren
In August 2019, Obika signed a two-year deal with Scottish Premiership side St Mirren. He scored 8 goals in the league, the last of which came in a 1–0 win over Hearts which relegated the Edinburgh club.

Morecambe
In June 2021, Obika signed a two-year deal with League One side Morecambe.

Loan to Motherwell 
At the end of January 2023, Obika joined Scottish Premiership club Motherwell on loan until the end of the season.

International career
Obika was called up to represent England in the Under 20 World Cup tournament hosted in Egypt from 24 September – 16 October 2009. Obika featured in the first two games against Ghana and Uruguay.

Personal life
Obika was born in Enfield, London and grew up in Edmonton. He attended The Bishop Stopford's School in Enfield. He is of Nigerian descent and is the cousin of singer and former Fame Academy contestant Lemar.

Career statistics

Honours
Individual
 Sky Bet Football League Team of the Week 13/09/14 – 14/09/14

References

External links

1990 births
Living people
Footballers from Enfield, London
English people of Nigerian descent
English footballers
England youth international footballers
Black British sportsmen
Association football forwards
English Football League players
Tottenham Hotspur F.C. players
Yeovil Town F.C. players
Millwall F.C. players
Crystal Palace F.C. players
Peterborough United F.C. players
Swindon Town F.C. players
Oxford United F.C. players
Charlton Athletic F.C. players
Brighton & Hove Albion F.C. players
St Mirren F.C. players
Morecambe F.C. players
Motherwell F.C. players
People educated at Bishop Stopford's School at Enfield
Scottish Professional Football League players